Lydia Cornell (born Lydia Korniloff, July 23, 1953) is an American actress best known for her role as Sara Rush on the ABC situation comedy Too Close for Comfort.

Early life and family 
Cornell was born Lydia Korniloff in El Paso, Texas on July 23, 1953. She is the eldest daughter of concert violinist Irma Jean Stowe, the great-granddaughter of Harriet Beecher Stowe, and Gregory Jacob Korniloff, a graduate of the Los Angeles Conservatory of Music and Arts, who was later assistant concertmaster of the El Paso Symphony Orchestra. Cornell is the elder sister of the late Paul Korniloff, a piano prodigy, and Kathryn Korniloff, co-founder of the band Two Nice Girls and a sound designer and composer since 1995.

While a nine-year-old fourth grade student at Mesita Elementary School, Cornell was chosen as El Paso's "Little Miss Cotton" in March 1963.

In 1966, Cornell and her family moved to Scarsdale, New York. She attended both Scarsdale Junior High School and Scarsdale High School, from which she graduated in 1971.

After graduation, Cornell enrolled at the University of Colorado Boulder, where she studied business, drama, English, Russian, Spanish and Anthropology. During the summer between her sophomore and junior year in college, she worked at the recording studio Caribou Ranch in Nederland, Colorado. There she met Billy Joel, Dennis Wilson, Carole King, Joni Mitchell, David Cassidy, and photographer Henry Diltz. As a Caribou Ranch photographer and "kitchen girl" she brought food to the cabins (Ooray, Running Bear, the Grizzle Bear Lodge) of such rock stars as The Beach Boys, America, Chicago and Billy Joel. The Ozark Mountain Daredevils gave her a credit on their album Men from Home. Before graduation, Cornell was the road manager for musician Michael Murphy. In May 1976, Cornell graduated from UC Boulder with a Bachelor of Science in Business, with majors in both advertising and English/drama.

By the time of her father's death in May 1977, Cornell had joined the rest of the Korniloff family, who had been living in The Hague, the Netherlands since mid-1975. Soon after, her mother and siblings moved back to El Paso, Texas. By 1978 Cornell had moved to Los Angeles to pursue an acting career. While there she had a job for three months working at a recording studio and modeling for album covers, before being employed by Jack Webb Productions as a secretary-production assistant.  Still known as Lydia Korniloff, Cornell also worked as an assistant to the producer on the television movie Little Mo, a biography of tennis star Maureen Connolly.

Acting career 
Cornell's first screen appearance was as Lydia Korniloff in a walk-on as a girl in a car in the film Steel (1979), produced by and starring Lee Majors. Her first professional speaking part was in an episode of The Love Boat, for which she had two lines. In the summer of 1980, Cornell spent nine weeks filming in the Greek Isles for her appearance in the mythological horror film Blood Tide, which was not released until 1982.

Cornell's first major role was as Sara Rush, "a ditzy, big-breasted blonde", on Too Close for Comfort from 1980–85. In 1982, at the height of the sitcom's popularity, Cornell was described by sexologist Robert T. Francoeur as providing a modern example of "classic female stereotypes in the mold of Marilyn Monroe and Jayne Mansfield".

Cornell appeared in single episode roles on numerous television series over the years, including The Love Boat, Charlie's Angels, The Drew Carey Show, Quantum Leap (the pilot episode) Full House, Knight Rider, The Dukes of Hazzard, The A-Team, T. J. Hooker, Simon & Simon, Hunter, Hardball, Black Scorpion, Hotel, Fantasy Island and Curb Your Enthusiasm. She also appeared as a guest on episodes of television game shows, such as Battle of the Network Stars, Super Password and Match Game Hollywood Squares Hour.

Filmography

Film

Television

References

External links 
 
 
 

1953 births
Living people
American film actresses
American television actresses
American people of Russian descent
Actresses from El Paso, Texas
Actresses from New York (state)
Scarsdale High School alumni
20th-century American actresses
21st-century American actresses